Frinton-on-Sea railway station is on the Walton branch of the Sunshine Coast Line in the East of England, serving the seaside town of Frinton-on-Sea, Essex. Its three-letter station code is FRI.

The station was opened by the Tendring Hundred Railway, a subsidiary of the Great Eastern Railway, in 1867. It is currently managed by Greater Anglia, which also operates all trains serving the station.

History
The station was opened with the name Frinton by the Tendring Hundred Railway (THR) in 1867. The Great Eastern Railway (GER) acquired the THR and the adjacent Clacton-on-Sea Railway on 1 July 1883. The Wivenhoe & Brightlingsea line was absorbed by the GER on 9 June 1893.

The line became part of the London and North Eastern Railway (LNER) in 1923 and then the Eastern Region of British Railways in 1948 following nationalisation of the railways.

The station is immediately to the west of a level crossing that provides road access to Frinton. Residents of the town who live inside the gates of the crossing attach a particular status to this fact. These wooden gates were, until 2009, the only manually-operated level crossing gates on the line. The level crossing is now protected by a barrier system.

The station's name was changed to Frinton-on-Sea in 2007.

Services
In 1929 the LNER introduced luxurious Pullman day excursion trips from Liverpool Street to various seaside resorts. The service ended in September 1939 at the outset of World War II.

The current service pattern is:

Passengers for  must change at Thorpe-le-Soken for a connection, however during weekday evenings there are two direct services to Clacton, however there are no direct return services.

References

External links 

Railway stations in Essex
DfT Category E stations
Former Great Eastern Railway stations
Greater Anglia franchise railway stations
Railway stations in Great Britain opened in 1867
Tendring